The National Steel Corporation (1929–2003) was a major American steel producer.  It was founded in 1929 through a merger arranged by Weirton Steel with  some properties of the Great Lakes Steel Corporation and M.A. Hanna Company with headquarters in Pittsburgh.  Despite a difficult market in Depression-setting 1930, the company reported USD 8.4 million in profits. Again, in 1931 the company was profitable unlike many other competitors.  The company could attribute its success primarily to sales to the automobile industry.  Large steel producing operations were located near Detroit, providing the company with low shipping costs.  Throughout the Great Depression, National Steel obtained profitability every year.

Post war years
The post-World War II years brought about record profits for the company as steel was in high demand.  The company continued to post healthy profits in the 1970s, although the latter half of the decade saw some sharp and turbulent profit slumps.  The increasing consumption of imported steel was often an attributed problem.  It acquired United Financial Corporation, in 1979, adding another sundry item for its portfolio. United Financial was the parent company of Citizens Savings & Loan Association of San Francisco, which was the seventh‐largest savings and loan in the United States.

1980s
Beginning in 1980, the company reported a serious loss of demand and with it profits in its core steel business.  A roller coaster earnings surge the next year crashed down the year after that due to a further increase in imports and low demand.   In 1983, shareholders agreed to create National Intergroup, a holding company, and merge the steel business as one many units into it.  The corporate reorganization was a further step to an already initiated arrangement that started in 1982, which broke the company into six independently managed units. The move was intended to better administer the company which had become diversified away from steel into aluminum and financial services.  That same year, the workers of the Weirton mill purchased their operation from National Steel, forming an independent employee-owned corporation.

In February 1984, Nippon Kokan K.K., a major Japanese steel producer, acquired 50% of National Steel from National Intergroup for US$292 million.  Later in 1990, the Japanese firm would claim another 20% share from National Intergroup, which was eager to sell the steel business.  The company stumbled through troubled years as it shed thousands of workers and faced bankruptcy in 1991.

Amidst the savings and loan crisis in 1981, West Side Federal Savings and Loan Association of New York and the Washington Savings and Loan Association of Miami were acquired and merged with Citizens, creating the country's largest federally chartered savings and loan association. The Federal Home Loan Bank Board approved the first interstate consolidation of savings and loan associations largely because National Steel was willing to provide $75 million in cash to the new association, whose combined assets would be $6.8 billion with 136 branches in the three states. The branches were rebranded as First Nationwide Savings in 1982, when National Steel sold a 19% share of First Nationwide to the public. Ford Motor Company acquired First Nationwide for $493 million in 1985.

National Steel spun-off its computer data subsidiary Genix which spun-off the current-day Corporate Election Services, a market leader in proxy statement and proxy fight services based in suburban Pittsburgh.

1990s
The company announced in 1991 that it would re-locate its longtime Pittsburgh headquarters to the South Bend, Indiana, area.

In 1994, the company caused a stir in the industry when it terminated nearly all of its vice presidents, President and CFO, and replaced them by hiring nearly the complete executive staff of the U.S. Steel Gary Works, including V. John Goodwin who was named the new President of National Steel.  U.S. Steel was incensed and filed a lawsuit which the two companies settled out-of-court in 1995.   However these drastic leadership changes were short-lived, as Goodwin resigned in 1996, the result of a bitter dispute with the Japanese ownership and by 1998 nearly all of the U.S. Steel expatriates had departed from National.

2000s
The darkest days of National's management history occurred in 2000, when an internal auditor, tipped off by an informer, discovered that longtime executive James Squires was receiving millions of dollars in kickbacks from scrap suppliers.  This was an especially painful event for the company because Squires had been hailed as a "self-made man" who had advanced from a mill laborer to a Senior Vice President over the course of his 42-year career, and had professed to be the pinnacle of financial stewardship.  Nevertheless, in August 2001, Squires was convicted in Federal Court of receiving kickbacks, and in 2002 was sentenced to two years imprisonment.  Later he was forced to pay National approximately $3,000,000 in a civil lawsuit.  In his allocution at sentencing, Squires noted, apologetically, that he had taken the improper payments because the company was promoting "Harvard MBA's" more rapidly than it was promoting him.  The truth of the matter, however, was that Squires was one of the company's most senior executives, and that National Steel did not have any Harvard MBA's within its ranks, let alone any who were promoted ahead of Squires.

The company then lumbered along for the next few years, hampered by doddering executive management.  It filed for bankruptcy protection in 2002, the result of a deep depression in the industry at the time combined with the laggard leadership.

Bankruptcy
The company would never again enjoy extended periods of profit and finally in March 2002, it filed for bankruptcy with only $2.3 billion in assets for $2.6 billion in debt.  After a bidding war between AK Steel and U.S. Steel, in May 2003 the remains of National Steel were sold to U.S. Steel for $850 million and the assumption of $200 million in debt.  US Steel continues to operate National's Keewatin, Minnesota mining operation and pellet plant under the new name of Keewatin Taconite or Keetac.

Notes
 "National Steel Net $3.91 a share", Wall Street Journal, March 21, 1931
 "One Steelmaker Earns Dividends", Wall Street Journal, June 30, 1932

References

External links

National Steel webpage (archive) - A July 24, 2004 Internet Archive cache of the site which no longer remains

Steel companies of the United States
U.S. Steel
Manufacturing companies based in Detroit
American companies established in 1929
Manufacturing companies established in 1929
Manufacturing companies disestablished in 2003
1929 establishments in Michigan
2000s disestablishments in Michigan
Former components of the Dow Jones Industrial Average
Defunct manufacturing companies based in Michigan